The New Year Honours 1899 were appointments by Queen Victoria to various orders and honours of the United Kingdom and British India.

They were published in The Times on 2 January 1899, and the various honours were gazetted in The London Gazette on 2 January 1899, 10 January 1899, and on 13 January 1899.

The recipients of honours are displayed or referred to as they were styled before their new honour, and arranged by honour and where appropriate by rank (Knight Grand Cross, Knight Commander, etc.) then divisions (Military, Civil).

Peerages

Viscount
 Evelyn Baring, 1st Baron Cromer

Baron
 The Right Honourable Sir Philip Currie, GCB
 Sir Joseph Russell Bailey, Bart.
 Sir Henry Hawkins
 Robert Thornhagh Gurdon, Esq.

Privy Council
 Sir William Walrond, Bart., MP
 Sir Charles Hall, KCMG, MP, Recorder of London
 Colonel Edward James Saunderson, MP
 William Kenrick, Esq., MP

Privy Council of Ireland
 Windham Wyndham-Quin, 4th Earl of Dunraven and Mount-Earl, KP
 Colonel Edward Henry Cooper, Her Majesty′s Lord Lieutenant for County Sligo

Baronetcy
 Sir Henry Thompson, FRCS
 William Henry Hornby, Esq., MP
 Francis Tress Barry, MP
 John Murray Scott

Knight Bachelor

 Thomas Townsend Bucknill, QC, justice of the High Court
 Fortescue Flannery, MP
 John Furley, Commissioner to National Aid Society
 Edward Lawrence, JP and Mayor of Liverpool in 1864-65
 Henry Evelyn Oakeley, lately Chief Inspector of Schools at the Education Department
 David Richmond, Lord Provost of Glasgow
 Hermann Weber, MD
 Arthur Strachey, LLD, Chief Justice of the High Court, Allahabad
 William Mure, late Senior Puisne Judge of the Supreme Court of the Colony of Mauritius
 James Henderson, Lord Mayor of Belfast
 John Barr Johnston, the Mayor of Londonderry
 John Chute Neligan, Recorder of Cork
 Dr. Plunkett O′Farrell, Commissioner of Control and Inspector of Lunatic Asylums in Ireland

Other 1899 Knights Bachelor
 John Thomas Soundby, JP and Mayor of Windsor (May 24)

The Most Honourable Order of the Bath

Knight Grand Cross of the Order of the Bath (GCB) 
 Civil Division
 Sir Hugh Owen, KCB, late Permanent Secretary to the Local Government Board
 Sir Charles Lennox Peel, KCB, late Clerk of the Council

Knights Commander of the Order of the Bath (KCB) 
 Civil Division
 Carey John Knyvett, Esq., CB, late Principal Clerk, Home Office
 Henry Primrose, Esq., CB, CSI
 William Chandler Roberts-Austen, CB, FRS, Chemist and Assayer to the Royal Mint
 Edward Wingfield, Permanent Under-Secretary of State for the Colonies

Companions of the Order of the Bath (CB) 
Civil division
 Charles Henry Alderson, Esq., Charity Commissioner
 Jasper Capper Badcock, Esq., Controller of London Postal Service
 Robert Henry Boyce, Esq., Office of Works
 Evelyn Ruggles-Brise, Esq., Chairman of the Prison Commission
 Sir Charles Cameron, Bart., MD
 Henry Cockburn, Chinese Secretary to Legation, Peking
 Lieutenant-Colonel Arthur Collins, MVO
 Honourable Sidney Robert Greville, Esq.
 Frederick John Jackson, Esq., Her Majesty′s Vice Consul and First Class Assistant, Uganda
 John Joseph Casimer Jones, Esq., Chief Commissioner, Dublin Metropolitan Police
 Walter Loois Frederick Goltz Langley, Esq., Foreign Office
 Henry Walrond Simpkinson, Esq., Education Department
 John Steele, Chief Inspector of Excise
 George Wilson, Her Majesty′s Vice Consul and First Class Assistant, Uganda

Order of the Star of India

Knights Commander of the Order of the Star of India (KCSI)
 His Highness Rasul Khanji Mahabat Khanji, Nawab of Junagarh
 Charles Cecil Stevens, Esq., CSI, Indian Civil Service

Companions of the Order of the Star of India (CSI)
 Mackenzie Dalzell Chalmers, Esq., Member of the Governor-General's Council.
 Arundel Tagg Arundel, Esq, Indian Civil Service.
 Lieutenant-Colonel Donald Robertson, Indian Staff Corps.
 His Highness Raja Kirti Sah of Tehri Garhwal
 John Prescott Hewett, Esq., CIE, Indian Civil Service.
 Colonel William Pleace Warburton, MD, Indian Medical Service.
 Colonel David Sinclair, MB, Indian Medical Service.

Order of St Michael and St George

Knights Grand Cross of the Order of St Michael and St George (GCMG)
 The Right Honourable Henry Brand, 2nd Viscount Hampden, Governor and Commander-in-Chief of the Colony of New South Wales.
 Sir Thomas Fowell Buxton, Bart., KCMG, Governor and Commander-in-Chief of the Colony of South Australia.
 His Excellency the Right Honourable Sir Charles Stewart Scott, KCMG, CB, Her Majesty's Ambassador at St. Petersburg
 Major-General Sir Herbert Charles Chermside, Royal Engineers, KCMG, CB, Her Majesty's Military Commissioner in Crete, for distinguished services in Crete

Knights Commander of the Order of St Michael and St George (KCMG)
 Sir John Madden, Chief Justice of the Supreme Court of the Colony of Victoria, who has on several occasions administered the government of the Colony.
 William Turner Thiselton Dyer, Esq., CMG, CIE, Director of the Royal Botanic Gardens, Kew, in recognition of services rendered to Colonial Governments.
 Nevile Lubbock, Esq., Chairman of the West India Committee, for services rendered in connection with the West Indian Colonies.
 Henry Howard, Esq., CB, Her Majesty's Envoy Extraordinary and Minister Plenipotentiary at The Hague
 Edmund Douglas Veitch Fane, Esq., Her Majesty's Envoy Extraordinary and Minister Plenipotentiary at Copenhagen
 Colonel James Hayes Sadler, late Her Majesty's Consul-General at Valparaíso

Honorary Knight Commander of the order of St Michael and St George
 Boutros Pasha Ghali, Foreign Minister to His Highness the Khedive of Egypt

Companions of the Order of St Michael and St George (CMG)
 Major-General William Julius Gascoigne, lately General Officer Commanding the Militia of Canada.
 Charles Walter Sneyd Kynnersley, Esq, Resident Councillor at Penang.
 Major (local Colonel) James Willcocks, DSO, for services with the West African Frontier Force on the Niger.
 Frank Rohrweger, Esq., for services as Political Officer attached to the Forces in the Lagos Protectorate.
 Major John Hanbury-Williams, Military Secretary to the Governor and Commander-in-Chief of the Colony of the Cape of Good Hope.
 Matthew Nathan, Royal Engineers, Secretary to the Colonial Defence Committee.
 Major the Honourable Charles Granville Fortescue, for services in the Northern Territories of the Gold Coast.
 Captain John George Orlebar Aplin, Inspector in the Gold Coast Constabulary.
 Captain Sir Edward Chichester, Bart., Royal Navy, for services during recent events at Manila
 Major Henry Lionel Gallwey, DSO, Her Majesty's Acting Commissioner and Consul General for the Niger Coast Protectorate
 Major James Henry Bor, Deputy Assistant Adjutant-General, for services in Crete
 Robert Unwin Moffat, Esq., MB, for service during the recent Uganda mutiny
 James Simpson Macpherson, Esq., for service during the recent Uganda mutiny
 William Grant, Esq., for service during the recent Uganda mutiny

Order of the Indian Empire

Knights Commander of the Order of the Indian Empire (KCIE)
 Andrew Wingate, Esq., CIE, Indian Civil Service.
 Kunwar Harnam Singh, Ahluwalia, CIE, of Kapurthala.
 Major-General Gerald de Courcy Morton, CB
 Major-General George Corrie Bird, CB, Indian Staff Corps.

Companions of the Order of the Indian Empire (CIE)
 Joy Gobind Law, Esq., Additional Member of the Legislative Council of the Governor-General.
 Lieutenant-Colonel Henry Kellock McKay, Indian Medical Service.
 John Sime, Esq, Director of Public Instruction in the Punjab.
 Alexander Izat, Esq
 Rai Bahadur Thakur Mangal Singh
 Rai Bahadur Dhanpat Rai Sardar Bahadur
 Khan Bahadur Dhanjibhai Fakirji Commodore
 Major Winthropp Benjamin Browning, Indian Medical Service
 Major John Joseph Holdsworth, Gorakhpur Light Horse
 Francis Jack Needham, Esq
 Edulji Dinshah

Personal salute of 21 guns
 His Highness Shri Padmanabha Dasa Vanji Sir Balarania Varma Kulashekhara Kritapati Mani Sultan Maharaja Raja Rama Raja Bahadur Shamsher Jang, of Travancore, GCSI

References

 

New Year Honours
1899 in the United Kingdom
1899 awards